This is a list of battalions of the Connaught Rangers, which existed as an infantry regiment of the British Army from 1881 to 1922.

Original composition
When the 88th Regiment of Foot (Connaught Rangers), and 94th Regiment of Foot amalgamated to form The Connaught Rangers in 1881 under the Cardwell-Childers reforms of the British Armed Forces, four pre-existent militia regiments of Connaught were integrated into the structure of the regiment. The only change to the regiment's structure during the period of 1881-1908 occurred in 1889, when the 6th (Militia) Battalion was absorbed by the 3rd (Militia) Battalions.

Reorganisation

In 1908, the militia battalions transferred to the "Special Reserve", alongside this, the 3rd (Militia) Battalion disbanded, and the 2 Battalions were renumbered sequentially.

First World War
The Connaughts fielded 6 battalions and lost approximately 2,500 officers and other ranks during the course of the war. Two battalions of the regiment were formed as part of Secretary of State for War Lord Kitchener's appeal for an initial 100,000 men volunteers in 1914.

Disbandment
In 1919, the 2nd Battalion was reformed, by redesignation of the 5th (Service) Battalion. And in 1921, the Special Reserve reverted to its militia designation.

Following the establishment of the Irish Free State in 1922, the regiment disbanded, along with the other five regiments that had their traditional recruiting grounds in the counties of the new state.

References

Bibliography
 David C. A. Wilkins, Defence Prepared: The Galway Militia from 1793, Journal of the Galway Archaeological and Historical Society, Vol. 50 (1998), pp. 37–48

Connaught Rangers
Connaught Rangers, List of battalions
Connaught Rangers
Connaught Rangers
Battalions